Charles Puchmayr (born 1953 or 1954) is a Canadian politician, who was an MLA for New Westminster in British Columbia from 2005 to 2009. He is a member of the British Columbia New Democratic Party.

Prior to his election to the legislature in the 2005 election, Puchmayr was a city councillor in New Westminster from 1996 to 2005. He was also a founder of the New Westminster Food Bank and the Unemployment Action Centre, and a director of the Westminster Legal Services Society.

He announced in early 2009 that he would not run in the 2009 provincial election for health reasons.

Puchmayr was elected to New Westminster City Council in 2011 and re-elected in 2014 and 2018. He ran for mayor of the city in 2022, but lost.

References

External links
 Profile at the Legislative Assembly of British Columbia

British Columbia New Democratic Party MLAs
British Columbia municipal councillors
Living people
People from New Westminster
Year of birth missing (living people)
21st-century Canadian politicians